Ukraine ranks as one of the highest for civilian casualties from landmines and unexploded ordnances, and the highest for anti-vehicle mine incidents globally. During the 2022 Russian invasion of Ukraine, the Red Cross said one of the evacuation routes proposed by Russia was lined with landmines. According to Human Rights Watch in June 2022, "Russia is the only party to the conflict known to have used banned antipersonnel mines, while both Russia and Ukraine have used anti-vehicle mines." However Russia never signed the Ottawa Treaty that they were referring to, meaning only Ukraine has an obligation not to use them.

References  

Ukraine
Military equipment of the 2022 Russian invasion of Ukraine
War crimes during the 2022 Russian invasion of Ukraine
War in Donbas